is a station located in Suita, Osaka Prefecture, Japan.

Lines
Hankyu Senri Line

Layout
There are 2 side platforms and 2 tracks on the ground level.

Stations next to Toyotsu

External links
 http://www.hankyu.co.jp/station/toyotsu.html Toyotsu Station] from Hankyu Railway website

Railway stations in Osaka Prefecture